"St. Anger" is a song by American heavy metal band Metallica. It was released on June 23, 2003, as the lead single from their eighth studio album of the same name. It won Best Metal Performance at the 46th Grammy Awards and was also nominated for Best Rock Video at the 2003 MTV Video Music Awards, but lost to "Somewhere I Belong" by Linkin Park.

This song provided the theme for WWE's SummerSlam 2003; the music video was also included in the pay-per-view DVD.

The lyric "Fuck it all and fuckin' no regrets, I hit the lights on these dark sets" may be a reference to two other Metallica songs, "Damage, Inc." (Master of Puppets) and "Hit the Lights" (Kill 'Em All).

Music video
The "St. Anger" video, directed by The Malloys, was shot in San Quentin State Prison, California. The band played at various locations in the area to hundreds of enthusiastic inmates, except for the death chambers and the death row cells. It is also the first Metallica video to feature bassist Robert Trujillo, who joined just prior to filming.

The video begins with Metallica drummer Lars Ulrich starting the beat saying "En, to, tre, fire!" (taken from the live in studio performance of "The Unnamed Feeling") which translated from Danish means "One, two, three, four!" At the end of the video, a sentence appears on a black background, reading: "For all the souls impacted by San Quentin, your spirit will forever be a part of Metallica."

It won a 2003 Metal Edge Readers' Choice Award for Video of the Year.

Track list

Chart positions

References

2003 singles
Metallica songs
Songs written by James Hetfield
Songs written by Lars Ulrich
Songs written by Kirk Hammett
Songs written by Bob Rock
Music videos directed by The Malloys
Grammy Award for Best Metal Performance
2003 songs
Song recordings produced by Bob Rock
Elektra Records singles